John Darby may refer to:

John Darby (NASCAR official), NASCAR Sprint Cup Series director
John Fletcher Darby (1803–1882), American politician
John M. Darby, botanist (1804–1877), American academic and chemist
John Nelson Darby (1800–1882), 19th-century Anglo-Irish evangelist and religious writer
John Darby (Dean of Chester) (1831–1919), Anglican priest
John Darby (printer) (died in 1704), English printer

Fictional
Darby and Joan, a character in this poem

See also
John Derby (disambiguation)